Oka (written:  or ) is a Japanese surname. Notable people with the surname include:

, Japanese zoologist, anatomist and evolutionist
 Ayumi Oka (born 1983), Japanese actress
 Ayumi Oka (born 1986), Japanese female tennis player
 Gedong Bagus Oka (1921–2002), Hindu reformer and philosopher in Indonesia
, Japanese fencer
 , Japanese businessman in whaling
 Kazuo Oka (born 1948), Japanese voice actor
 Kiyoshi Oka (1901–1978), Japanese mathematician
 Masi Oka (born 1974), Japanese American actor and digital effects artist
 , Japanese sinologist
 Takeshi Oka (born 1932), Japanese-American chemist and astronomer
 , Japanese fencer

Fictional characters
Oka (Asobi Asobase), a character in the manga series Asobi Asobase

Other people
 Arsene Oka (born 1983), Côte d'Ivoire football (soccer) player

See also 
 Ōka (surname)
 Ōoka (disambiguation)

Japanese-language surnames